Gúa is one of fifteen parishes (administrative divisions) in Somiedo, a municipality within the province and autonomous community of Asturias, in northern Spain.  

The postal code is 33840.

Villages
 Caunedo (Caunéu)
 Gúa
 La Peral
 Llamardal (El L.lamardal)

Parishes in Somiedo